Timur Ramilevich Faizutdinov (6 October 2001 – 16 March 2021) was a Russian ice hockey defenceman. He played for HC Dinamo Saint Petersburg, of which he was the team captain at the time of his death.

On 12 March 2021, Faizutdinov was struck in the head by a hockey puck while playing in the final 16 of the Kharlamov Cup against Lokomotiv Yaroslavl in Yaroslavl, Russia. Faizutdinov's father, Ramil, wrote on social media that his son was struck in the area of the carotid artery. Faizutdinov was hospitalized in serious condition and died on 16 March 2021 at the age of 19. HC Dinamo Saint Petersburg announced that upcoming games would begin with a minute of silence for Faizutdinov.

References

External links

 Footage of the accident

2001 births
2021 deaths
HC Dinamo Saint Petersburg players
Ice hockey players who died while playing
Russian ice hockey defencemen
Sport deaths in Russia
Sportspeople from Chelyabinsk